Seshanbe (Russian and Tajik: Сешанбе) is a village and jamoat in Tajikistan. It is part of the city of Tursunzoda in Districts of Republican Subordination. The jamoat has a total population of 15,197 (2015).

Notes

References

Populated places in Districts of Republican Subordination
Jamoats of Tajikistan